Steven O'Dor (born 28 January 1987) in Melbourne is a retired Australian footballer.

Club career
He went to school at Haileybury College from Year 4 through to Year 12, making the first team in Year 8. As a junior player he played for Monash City FC in the Super League from 2000 to 2003. Finishing his schooling in 2004 he then moved on to start a University Degree in law and commerce at Deakin University in Melbourne.

His senior career commenced with South Melbourne in the Victorian Premier League, then moving onto the Australian Institute of Sport and the New Zealand Knights in the A-League. He made several starts for the Knights in the latter part of their 2006–07 season.

On 5 May 2007 he was signed by Wellington Phoenix on a two-year deal.

On 17 January 2008 O'Dor decided to terminate his two-year contract with the Phoenix after receiving a letter from Deakin University explaining that he needed to resume his university studies.

On 17 September 2008 he returned to South Melbourne, signing a two-year deal.

In February 2012, O'Dor decided to retire from football to continue his studies.

He was most recently working as head coach of Mazenod United Football Club, an Old Collegians seniors team located in Mulgrave, Melbourne.

International career
He has made 15 appearances for the Young Socceroos, making his debut in 2006 in a 3–0 win against Turkmenistan.

Honours
With South Melbourne:
  Victorian Premier League Championship:2006

References

External links
 OzFootball Profile

1987 births
Living people
Soccer players from Melbourne
Australia youth international soccer players
Australia under-20 international soccer players
A-League Men players
New Zealand Knights FC players
South Melbourne FC players
Wellington Phoenix FC players
Expatriate association footballers in New Zealand
People educated at Haileybury (Melbourne)
Australian Institute of Sport soccer players
Association football defenders
Australian soccer players
Deakin University alumni
Australian expatriate sportspeople in New Zealand
Australian expatriate soccer players